Rainton railway station briefly served the village of West Rainton, County Durham, England, in 1844 on the Leamside Line.

History 
The station opened in August 1844 by the Newcastle and Darlington Junction Railway. It was situated near Marks Lane bridge. It was a very short-lived railway station, only being open for one month before closing in September 1844.

References

External links 

Disused railway stations in County Durham
Railway stations opened in 1844
Railway stations closed in 1844
1844 establishments in England
1844 disestablishments in England

Railway stations in Great Britain opened in 1844